Bara is a town in Oyo State of southwestern Nigeria. It is located just west of the Oko-Iressa-Aadu Road. The majority of the people are members of the Yoruba ethnic group. Most of the people are employed in agriculture with locally produced yams, cassava, maize, and tobacco.

Notes and references

Populated places in Oyo State